Willem Tumpal Pandapotan Simarmata (4 July 1954 – 17 June 2022) was an Indonesian politician.

He served in the Regional Representative Council from 2019 to 2022.

Simarmata died in Medan on 17 June 2022 at the age of 67.

References

1954 births
2022 deaths
Indonesian politicians
People from North Tapanuli Regency
People of Batak descent
Members of the People's Representative Council, 2019